In the AFL Women's (AFLW), the Gold Coast Club Champion award is awarded to the best and fairest player at the Gold Coast Suns during the home-and-away season. The award has been awarded annually since the club's inaugural season in the competition in 2020, and Jamie Stanton was the inaugural winner of the award.

Recipients

See also

 Gold Coast Suns Club Champion (list of Gold Coast Suns best and fairest winners in the Australian Football League)

References

AFL Women's awards
Lists of AFL Women's players
Gold Coast Suns
Awards established in 2020